Gradec is a village in the municipality of Vrapčište, North Macedonia. It used to be part of Negotino-Pološko Municipality.

Demographics
As of the 2021 census, Graadec had 3,934 residents with the following ethnic composition:
Albanians 3,833
Persons for whom data are taken from administrative sources 95
Others 6

According to the 2002 census, the village had a total of 4,555 inhabitants. Ethnic groups in the village include:
Albanians 4,535
Macedonians 7
Bosniaks  4
Others 9

Sports
Local football club KF Gradec plays in the OFS Gostivar league.

References

External links

Villages in Vrapčište Municipality
Albanian communities in North Macedonia